Amarres is a Spanish-language comedy-drama web series created by Fernanda Eguiarte and directed by Marcelo Tobar that premiered on HBO Max on 12 August 2021. The series, produced by Warner Bros. Discovery Americas, Dopamine and Turner Broadcasting System Latin America, is considered the first Latin American program made for HBO Max (under the banner Max Originals) to be released after the arrival of HBO Max in Latin America on 29 June 2021. It was also scheduled to be released in the second quarter of 2020 on TNT Latin America. It stars Gabriela de la Garza, Hugo Catalán, and Juan Pablo Medina. The series consists of 10 episodes of 45 minutes.

Cast

Main cast 
 Gabriela de la Garza as Ana
 Hugo Catalán as Ricardo
 Juan Pablo Medina as Roger
 Martín Saracho as Armando
 Alicia Jaziz as María
 Mauricio Isaac
 Nicole de Albornoz as Olga

Recurring and guest cast 
 Regina Flores Ribot
 Pablo Astiazarán
 Rafael Simón
 María Elena Olivares
 Nailea Norvind as Roberta
 Ricardo Reynaud
 Eligio Meléndez
 Jordy Ulloa
 Rocío de la Mañana
 Rubén Zamora
 Viviana Serna
 Irán Castillo
 Benny Emmanuel
 Verónica Toussaint

Episodes

References

External links 

Comedy-drama web series
2021 web series debuts
2021 web series endings
HBO Max original programming
Spanish-language television shows
Television shows filmed in Mexico
Television shows set in Mexico
2020s Mexican drama television series
2020s Mexican comedy television series
2021 Mexican television series debuts
2021 Mexican television series endings
2020s comedy-drama television series